Ben Haverkort (born 27 October 1961) is a Dutch former football player and referee. He played professional football in the Dutch second division before taking up refereeing, officiating in the Dutch first division and international football.

Playing career
After playing youth football for Ajax Haverkort spent time at Eerste Divisie teams Telstar, SC Cambuur and Emmen.

Refereeing career
After retiring from playing Haverkort took up refereeing in 1995 getting to national league level in 1999. Haverkort earned a place on the FIFA International Referees List beginning in 2002, serving as a fourth official in Euro 2004 qualifiers and 2006 World Cup qualifiers.

Haverkort retired from refereeing in 2011 to take up a management role for FC Groningen.

References

External links 
 
 
 

1961 births
Living people
Dutch football referees
Dutch footballers
SC Telstar players
SC Cambuur players
FC Emmen players
Footballers from Amsterdam
Association football defenders